Felicity Pia Hampel  (born 1 June 1955) is a prominent Australian human rights lawyer and, since 2005, judge of the County Court of Victoria. Hampel's career as a barrister began in 1981, and she became a Senior Counsel in 1996.

She has served  adjunct professor of law at Monash University, where she has often taught with her husband, former Supreme Court of Victoria Justice and Monash University Professor The Honourable George Hampel . She has also served as President of Liberty Victoria, and as Deputy Co-convenor of the Australian Republican Movement in Victoria. Hampel has also served as a Victorian Law Reform Commissioner and is a former Convenor of the Women Barristers Association.

In the 2021 Queen's Birthday Honours Hampel was appointed Member of the Order of Australia "significant service to the judiciary, to legal organisations, and to women".

Education
Hampel attended the Genazzano FCJ College in Kew, an eastern suburb of Melbourne. She holds a Bachelor of Arts and a Bachelor of Laws from Monash University.

References

 

1955 births
Living people
Members of the Order of Australia
Australian Senior Counsel
21st-century Australian judges
Australian women judges
Monash Law School alumni
Academic staff of Monash University
Judges from Melbourne
Judges of the County Court of Victoria
21st-century women judges
People educated at Genazzano FCJ College